Trevor J. Orchard is a British-American hold epidemiologist currently a Distinguished Professor at University of Pittsburgh. He received the Kelly West Award in 1993.

References

Year of birth missing (living people)
Living people
University of Pittsburgh faculty
American epidemiologists